The Burt L. Newkirk Award is an ASME-level award presented to "individuals under the age of 40 who have made a notable contribution to the field of tribology in research or development as evidenced by important tribology publications". The award is called after Burt L. Newkirk, who was an expert in the field of tribology.

List of recipients
Source: ASME

See also

 List of mechanical engineering awards

References

Awards established in 1920
Awards of the American Society of Mechanical Engineers